Cecil Bryan King (21 June 1888 – 13 July 1975) was a New Zealand professional rugby league footballer who played in the 1910s. He played at representative level for New Zealand (Heritage No. 80), Wellington and Taranaki, as a forward (prior to the specialist positions of), during the era of contested scrums. In 1913 he moved to Auckland and played for Newton Rangers where he scored 2 tries and kicked a conversion during the season. He played 2 matches for Auckland.

Playing career
King represented New Zealand in 1912 on their tour of Australia and toured Australia again in 1913.

References

1888 births
1975 deaths
New Zealand national rugby league team players
New Zealand rugby league players
Rugby league players from Napier, New Zealand
Rugby league props
Taranaki rugby league team players
Wellington rugby league team players